In object-oriented programming, a friend function, that is a "friend" of a given class, is a function that is given the same access as methods to private and protected data.
 

A friend function is declared by the class that is granting access, so friend functions are part of the class interface, like methods. Friend functions allow alternative syntax to use objects, for instance f(x) instead of x.f(), or g(x,y) instead of x.g(y). Friend functions have the same implications on encapsulation as methods.

A similar concept is that of friend class.

Use cases
This approach may be used in friendly function when a function needs to access private data in objects from two different classes. 
This may be accomplished in two similar ways
a function of global or namespace scope may be declared as friend of both classes
a member function of one class may be declared  as friend of another one. 
#include <iostream>
using namespace std;
 
class Foo; // Forward declaration of class Foo in order for example to compile.
class Bar {
  private:
      int a = 0;
  public:
      void show(Bar& x, Foo& y);
      friend void show(Bar& x, Foo& y); // declaration of global friend
};
 
class Foo {
  private:
      int b = 6;
  public: 
      friend void show(Bar& x, Foo& y); // declaration of global friend
      friend void Bar::show(Bar& x, Foo& y); // declaration of friend from other class 
};
 
// Definition of a member function of Bar; this member is a friend of Foo
void Bar::show(Bar& x, Foo& y) {
  cout << "Show via function member of Bar" << endl;
  cout << "Bar::a = " << x.a << endl;
  cout << "Foo::b = " << y.b << endl;
}
 
// Friend for Bar and Foo, definition of global function
void show(Bar& x, Foo& y) {
  cout << "Show via global function" << endl;
  cout << "Bar::a = " << x.a << endl;
  cout << "Foo::b = " << y.b << endl;
}
 
int main() {
   Bar a;
   Foo b;
 
   show(a,b);
   a.show(a,b);
}

References

 The C++ Programming Language by Bjarne Stroustrup

External links
C++ friend function tutorial at CoderSource.net
C++ friendship and inheritance tutorial at cplusplus.com

Method (computer programming)
Articles with example C++ code